The Bugs Bunny Crazy Castle, known in Japan as  for the Family Computer Disk System, is a 1989 puzzle video game developed by Kemco for the Nintendo Entertainment System. It is the first game in Kemco's Crazy Castle series and the only one that was released for a home console; the four subsequent games in the series were released on handheld devices. (This only includes games with the Crazy Castle title; a game in the Japanese Mickey Mouse series was reworked into Kid Klown in Night Mayor World, which saw an NES release and a sequel on Super NES but was not otherwise connected with the North American Crazy Castle games.)

Three different versions starred three different cartoon characters: Bugs Bunny, and Disney's Roger Rabbit and Mickey Mouse, and were first released in 1989. The object of the game is to guide Bugs through a series of rooms collecting carrots to advance through the levels. However, four other Looney Tunes characters are wandering the castle in a bid to stop Bugs: Sylvester, Daffy Duck, Yosemite Sam, and Wile E. Coyote.

The Japanese Game Boy version was followed by a sequel, Mickey Mouse II, in 1991.

Gameplay
While presented in a side-scroller format, Crazy Castle differs from standard side-scrollers such as Super Mario Bros. in that Bugs Bunny does not have the ability to jump; therefore, only by taking different routes can Bugs avoid enemies. Some of the levels have boxing gloves, invincibility potions, safes, crates, flower pots, or ten thousand-pound weights that can be used against the enemies in the game. As a result, the game has a "puzzle-solving" atmosphere.

Players score 100 points for every carrot with the last one in each floor giving the player an extra life, 100 points for every enemy defeated using invincibility bottles, 500 points per enemy using boxing glove, and 1000 points per enemy that gets hit with heavy objects. Because most NES game cartridges lacked the ability to save, passwords can be used to start at a certain level in this game.

Plot
Honey Bunny has been kidnapped by Wile E. Coyote, Yosemite Sam, Daffy Duck, and Sylvester. Bugs must travel through 60 levels (80 in the Game Boy version) in order to save her. To get past each level, Bugs must collect all 8 carrots in each level.

Characters
There are four enemy characters - Sylvester, Daffy Duck, Wile E. Coyote and Yosemite Sam. However, the Sylvester character has three variations - two gray, one green and one pink, Daffy has two variations, one being dark gray and one brown, and Yosemite Sam being either in blue or brown.
 Gray Sylvester - can only travel up a floor or a tube; cannot bypass a door or tube without going through it; cannot go under staircases; cannot stop moving; two of this kind can be used in a single level.
 Green Sylvester - can travel both up and down a floor or tube; can bypass a door or tube without going through it; can go under staircases; cannot stop moving.
 Pink Sylvester - can only travel up a floor or a tube; cannot bypass a door or tube without going through it; cannot go under staircases; able to stop moving after a short distance travelled.
 Yosemite Sam / Wile E. Coyote - cannot go through doors or tubes; once they've traveled down a staircase, they cannot go back up; cannot stop moving.
 Daffy Duck - cannot go through doors or tubes; once he has traveled down a staircase, he cannot go back up; able to stop moving after a short distance travelled.

Development
The North American NES game is a modified version of the Japan-exclusive Family Computer Disk System title, Roger Rabbit. Roger Rabbit is the game's playable character, all the villains are Who Framed Roger Rabbit-related, and hearts are collected. Due to Capcom owning the rights to develop and publish Disney film-based video games, as well as LJN already having published Rare's own video game adaptation of the film, Kemco decided to use Bugs Bunny, due to he and Roger both being rabbits, making it easier for Kemco to modify the Roger Rabbit game and release it outside Japan as The Bugs Bunny Crazy Castle. For the Game Boy version, Kemco's license to develop and/or publish video games based on Who Framed Roger Rabbit became outdated; however, they still had the license to create Disney-based video games, which they used to create Mickey Mouse for Game Boy. An early beta version of the game shows the working title as Bugs Bunny Fun House. In 1997, Kemco released the Game Boy version along with The Bugs Bunny Crazy Castle 2 in one cartridge under the name Bugs Bunny Collection.

Sequels
The game has spawned three sequels, including The Bugs Bunny Crazy Castle 2, Bugs Bunny: Crazy Castle 3, Bugs Bunny in Crazy Castle 4 and a spin-off game, Woody Woodpecker in Crazy Castle 5.

The Game Boy Japanese version, Mickey Mouse, has spawned four sequels, including Mickey Mouse II, Mickey Mouse III: Balloon Dreams, Mickey Mouse IV: The Magical Labyrinth, and Mickey Mouse V: The Magical Stick. Other games published by Kemco with Mickey Mouse include the spin-off game Mickey's Chase.

Legacy
The NES version of Bugs Bunny Crazy Castle was prominently featured in an Angry Video Game Nerd episode of the same name, which was released on August 5, 2009. It was featured again in the 2021 feature film, Space Jam: A New Legacy for a few brief moments, where a young LeBron James is given a Game Boy with the game inside it.

Reviews
Defunct Games
NES Archives
Random Access
Retro Game Reviews
Classic-games.net
Wizard Dojo
The Video Game Critic
Questicle.net
Zero
Amstar
Power Play

References

External links
 

1989 video games
Kemco games
Mickey Mouse video games
Nintendo Entertainment System games
Famicom Disk System games
Game Boy games
Video games developed in Japan
Video games featuring Bugs Bunny
Video games set in castles
Who Framed Roger Rabbit video games
Warner Bros. video games